Aidia is a genus of flowering plants in the family Rubiaceae. It was described by João de Loureiro in 1790. It has a wide distribution area and occurs in tropical Africa, tropical and subtropical Asia and the western Pacific.

Species 

 Aidia abeidii S.E.Dawson & Gereau
 Aidia acuminata (Blume) K.M.Wong
 Aidia acutipetala Ridsdale
 Aidia auriculata (Wall.) Ridsdale
 Aidia bakeri (Merr.) Ridsdale
 Aidia beccariana (Baill.) Ridsdale
 Aidia borneensis Ridsdale
 Aidia bracteata Ridsdale
 Aidia brisipensis Ridsdale
 Aidia chantonea Triveng.
 Aidia cochinchinensis Lour.
 Aidia congesta (Schltr. & K.Krause) Ridsdale
 Aidia corymbosa (Blume) K.M.Wong
 Aidia cowleyi Puttock
 Aidia densiflora (Wall.) Masam.
 Aidia dilleniacea (Baill.) Ridsdale
 Aidia endertii Ridsdale
 Aidia foveata Ridsdale
 Aidia gardneri (Thwaites) Tirveng.
 Aidia genipiflora (DC.) Dandy
 Aidia glabra (Valeton) Ridsdale
 Aidia halleri Ridsdale
 Aidia henryi (E.Pritz.) T.Yamaz.
 Aidia heterophylla Ridsdale
 Aidia impressinervis (King & Gamble) Ridsdale
 Aidia jambosoides (Valeton) Ridsdale
 Aidia kinabaluensis Ridsdale
 Aidia lancifolia K.M.Wong
 Aidia longiflora Ridsdale
 Aidia magnifolia Ridsdale
 Aidia merrillii (Chun) Tirveng.
 Aidia micrantha (K.Schum.) Bullock ex F.White
 Aidia moluccana Ridsdale
 Aidia ochroleuca (K.Schum.) E.M.A.Petit
 Aidia oxyodonta (Drake) T.Yamaz.
 Aidia paiei Ridsdale
 Aidia parvifolia (King & Gamble) K.M.Wong
 Aidia polystachya (Valeton) Ridsdale
 Aidia pseudospicata Ridsdale
 Aidia pulcherrima (Merr.) Ridsdale
 Aidia pycnantha (Drake) Tirveng.
 Aidia quintasii (K.Schum.) G.Taylor
 Aidia racemosa (Cav.) Tirveng.
 Aidia rhacodosepala (K.Schum.) E.M.A.Petit
 Aidia rubens (Hiern) G.Taylor
 Aidia salicifolia (H.L.Li) T.Yamaz.
 Aidia solomonensis Ridsdale
 Aidia tomentosa (Blume) Ridsdale
 Aidia vieillardii (Baill.) Ridsdale
 Aidia vitiensis (Seem.) Puttock
 Aidia wattii G.Taylor
 Aidia waugia Ridsdale
 Aidia yunnanensis (Hutch.) T.Yamaz.
 Aidia zippeliana (Scheff.) Ridsdale

References

External links 
 Aidia in the World Checklist of Rubiaceae

Rubiaceae genera
Gardenieae